The 2012–13 season in Bangladesh was the thirteenth in which first-class cricket was played at the domestic level. The main domestic competitions were the National Cricket League (NCL), the new Bangladesh Cricket League (BCL) and the second edition of the Bangladesh Premier League (BPL). Internationally, there was a tour by the West Indies.

International cricket

West Indies cricket team in Bangladesh

The West Indies cricket team toured Bangladesh for the fourth time. The tour consisted of two Test matches, five One Day Internationals and one Twenty20 match. West Indies won both Test matches and the Twenty20 while Bangladesh won the ODI series 3–2.

Domestic competitions

National Cricket League
The 2012–13 National Cricket League (NCL) was its thirteenth edition as a first-class competition. Khulna Division won the championship title for the fifth time.

Teams

Final standings

Match results

Bangladesh Premier League

The 2013 Bangladesh Premier League, the second staging of the tournament, was held from 18 January to 19 February and featured seven teams, with the addition of the Rangpur Riders to the original six. Champions Dhaka Gladiators retained their title, defeating Chittagong Kings by 43 runs in the final.

2012-13 Bangladesh Cricket League
The Bangladesh Cricket League (BCL) was inaugurated in the 2012-13 season as a first-class tournament comprising the best performing players from the 2012-13 National Cricket League (NCL). The BCL consists of four teams with each team made up of players from teams representing two adjacent regions in the NCL. The four teams were placed on sale as franchises, but only three of the teams attracted a buyer. The teams are as follows:
 Walton Central Zone (Dhaka Division and Dhaka Metropolis)
 Prime Bank South Zone (Khulna Division and Barisal Division)
 Islami Bank East Zone (Sylhet Division and Chittagong Division)
 BCB North Zone (Rajshahi Division and Rangpur Division)

Results

Final

Other matches

References

2012 in Bangladeshi cricket
2013 in Bangladeshi cricket
Bangladeshi cricket seasons from 2000–01
Domestic cricket competitions in 2012–13